Lillian Ortiz-Self (born 1960) is an American politician serving as a member of the Washington House of Representatives from the 21st District. Ortiz-Self was appointed to the state legislature on January 21, 2014 by the Snohomish County Council.

She's a member of the Washington state Commission on Hispanic Affairs. She also serves on the Educational Opportunity Gap Oversight and Accountability Committee.

References

Democratic Party members of the Washington House of Representatives
Living people
Hispanic and Latino American state legislators in Washington (state)
Hispanic and Latino American women in politics
Women state legislators in Washington (state)
21st-century American politicians
21st-century American women politicians
People from Mukilteo, Washington
1960 births